Douglas Scott Cunningham (born November 14, 1955) is a former American football wide receiver. He played for the Minnesota Vikings in 1979.

References

1955 births
Living people
American football wide receivers
Rice Owls football players
Minnesota Vikings players